Svend Wad (February 3, 1928 – December 4, 2004) was a boxer from Denmark, who competed in the Lightweight division during his career.

Amateur career
Wad was the Olympic Bronze Medalist at lightweight in London in 1948.  Below are his results from that tournament:

 Round of 32: defeated Gene Raymond (India) on points
 Round of 16: defeated Alberto Boullossa (Uruguay) on points
 Quarterfinal: defeated Maxie McCullagh (Ireland) on points
 Semifinal: lost to Gerald Dreyer (South Africa) on points
 Bronze Medal Bout:  won by walkover versus Wallace Smith (USA).

Pro career
Wad turned pro in 1949 and fought primarily in Denmark.  In 1951 he fought Jorgen Johansen for the Danish lightweight title but lost a decision.  Later that year he lost a decision to Duilio Loi in Switzerland, his only fight outside of Denmark.  He retired for good in 1958, having won 14 and lost 2 with 0 KO.

He was born in Haderslev.

External links
 Svend Wad's profile at databaseOlympics
 
 Svend Wad's profile at Sports Reference.com

1928 births
2004 deaths
Lightweight boxers
Olympic boxers of Denmark
Boxers at the 1948 Summer Olympics
Olympic bronze medalists for Denmark
Olympic medalists in boxing
Danish male boxers
Medalists at the 1948 Summer Olympics
People from Haderslev Municipality
Sportspeople from the Region of Southern Denmark